Homeless to Harvard: The Liz Murray Story is an American biographical drama television film directed by Peter Levin. The film premiered on Lifetime on April 7, 2003, and received three Primetime Emmy Award nominations, including Outstanding Made for Television Movie and Outstanding Lead Actress in a Miniseries or a Movie for Thora Birch.

Plot
Liz Murray is one of two daughters of an extremely dysfunctional Bronx family. Her father watches Jeopardy! and knows all the questions. Their bathtub does not drain so she has to shower while standing on an overturned bucket, to stay out of the fetid water.

As a young girl, Murray lives with her sister Lisa, their drug-addicted, schizophrenic mother Jean, who has AIDS and is practically blind, and their father Peter, also a drug addict who is intelligent, but also has AIDS, lacks social skills, and is not conscientious. She is removed from the home and placed into the care system as her father cannot take care of her.

At 15, she moves in with her mother, sister, and grandfather who sexually abused her mother and her aunt. After a fight with her grandfather who hits Liz, she runs away with a girl from school named Chris who is being abused at home.

After Jean dies of AIDS, which she contracted from sharing needles during her drug-abusing years, Liz gets a "slap in the face" by her mother's death and begins her work to finish high school, which she amazingly completed in two years, rather than the usual four. She becomes a star student and earns a scholarship to Harvard University through an essay contest sponsored by The New York Times.

Cast
 Thora Birch as Elizabeth "Liz" Murray
 Jennifer Pisana as young Liz Murray
 Michael Riley as Peter Finnerty
 Robert Bockstael as David
 Makyla Smith as Chris
 Kelly Lynch as Jean Murray
 Aron Tager as Pops
 Marla McLean as Lisa
 Elliot Page as young Lisa
 Marguerite McNeil as Eva
 Amber Godfrey as Dawn
 Seamus Morrison as Bobby
 John Fulton as old Irish cop
 Rejean Cournoyer as young Irish cop
 Mauralea Austin as Miss Wanda
 Cecil Wright as Mr. Maki

Reception

Awards and nominations
 2003 Emmy Awards
 Nominated: Outstanding Lead Actress in a Miniseries or a Movie — Thora Birch
 Nominated: Outstanding Made for Television Movie
 Nominated: Outstanding Single Camera Picture Editing for a Miniseries, Movie or a Special — Anita Brandt-Burgoyne
 2003 Casting Society of America (Artios)
 Nominated - Best Casting for TV Movie of the Week — Susan Edelman
 2004 American Cinema Editors (Eddies)
 Won - Best Edited Miniseries or Movie for Commercial Television — Anita Brandt-Burgoyne

Notes

References

External links
 
 
 Homeless to Harvard: The Liz Murray Story at Hollywood.com
 Homeless to Harvard: The Liz Murray Story at Starpulse.com
 Homeless to Harvard: The Liz Murray Story movie review & synopsis at Fandango.com
 Homeless to Harvard: The Liz Murray Story at Mylifetime.com

2003 television films
2003 films
2003 biographical drama films
2000s American films
2000s English-language films
American biographical drama films
American drama television films
Biographical television films
Films about dysfunctional families
Films about homelessness
Films about schizophrenia
Films directed by Peter Levin
Films scored by Louis Febre
Films set in the 1990s
Films set in Harvard University
Films set in New York City
HIV/AIDS in American films
HIV/AIDS in television
Lifetime (TV network) films